Lieren is a village in the Netherlands and part of the municipality of Apeldoorn.
It is situated about 8 km ( 5 miles) south-east of the city centre of Apeldoorn and 2 km east of Beekbergen.

Despite its size, Lieren has a primary school, a bakery and a few DIY-stores. Most of its income come from tourism, with the Veluwe close at hand and multiple camping sites nearby. Also, a steam-train station belonging to the VSM attracts many tourists.

Once in every 3 years, the Uutbuurt takes place in Lieren. This is an event at which almost the whole village is present. At this event local bands and artists perform.

Gallery

References 

Populated places in Gelderland
Apeldoorn